Madan Pandey is an Indian politician. He was elected to the Lok Sabha, lower house of the Parliament of India as a member of the Indian National Congress.

References

External links
Official biographical sketch in Parliament of India website

India MPs 1984–1989
Lok Sabha members from Uttar Pradesh
1917 births
Year of death missing
People from Uttar Pradesh